Tiran, Iran is a city in Isfahan Province, Iran

Esfid may also refer to:
 Tiran, Kerman, a village in Kerman Province, Iran
 Tiran, Lorestan, a village in Lorestan Province, Iran
 Tiran, Mazandaran, a village in Mazandaran Province, Iran
 Tiran, Razavi Khorasan, a village in Razavi Khorasan Province, Iran
 Tiran and Karvan County, in Isfahan Province